There have been two Hudson Baronetcies, both of which are now extinct. A third, which began with Sir Charles Hudson, 1st Baronet of Wanlip Hall on 21 June 1791, changed name with the second Baronet becoming the Palmer baronets.

Hudson baronets of Melton Mowbray, Leics (1660)

The Hudson Baronetcy of Melton Mowbray, in the County of Leicester was created on 3 July 1660, in the Baronetage of England, for Henry Hudson.  It became extinct on the death of the 7th Baronet in c. 1781
 Sir Henry Hudson, 1st Baronet (c. 1609–1690)
 Sir Edward Hudson, 2nd Baronet (c. 1637–1702)
 Sir Benjamin Hudson, 3rd Baronet (c. 1665–1730)
 Sir Charles Hudson, 4th Baronet (died 1752)
 Sir Skeffington Hudson, 5th Baronet (1683–1760)
 Sir Charles Hudson, 6th Baronet (died 1773)
 Sir Charles Vallavine Hudson, 7th Baronet (1755–c. 1781)

Hudson baronets of North Hackney, Middlesex (1942)
The Hudson Baronetcy of North Hackney, in the County of Middlesex was created on 9 July 1942, in the Baronetage of the United Kingdom, for the Conservative Party politician Austin Hudson.  It became extinct on his death in 1956.
 Sir Austin Uvedale Morgan Hudson, 1st Baronet (1897–1956)

References

Extinct baronetcies in the Baronetage of England
Extinct baronetcies in the Baronetage of the United Kingdom